Lawing may refer to:

People
 Garland Lawing, American baseball player
 Nellie Neal Lawing, American businesswoman
 W. Craig Lawing, American politician

Places
 Lawing, Alaska, USA
 Lawing, Missouri, USA
 Lawing, Sarawak, Malaysia